The following is the discography of Hawthorne Heights, an American rock band formed in 2001. The band was originally named A Day in the Life, and is from Dayton, Ohio. Their line-up currently consists of lead singer and rhythm guitarist JT Woodruff, lead guitarist and screaming vocalist Mark McMillon, bassist and backing vocalist Matt Ridenour, and drummer Chris Popadak. Hawthorne Heights found success with both of their first two albums, released through Victory Records. Their 2004 release, The Silence in Black and White, and their album, If Only You Were Lonely, both achieved Gold certification. Their second album additionally peaked at #1 on Billboard Independent Albums chart and #3 on the Billboard 200 charts. The two lead singles from their 2004 debut album, "Ohio Is for Lovers" and "Niki FM" both charted on Billboard'''s Alternative Songs chart. They are also well known for their 2006 single "Saying Sorry", which reached Gold status and peaked at #7 on the Billboard Hot Modern Rock Tracks chart. Hawthorne Height's third album, Fragile Future, placed at #23 on the Billboard 200. Their next album, Skeletons'', was released through Wind-up Records. It peaked at #50 on the Billboard 200.

Albums

Studio albums

Compilation albums

Extended plays

Other appearances

Singles

Videography

Video albums

Music videos
"Ohio Is for Lovers" (director: Shane C. Drake)
"Niki FM" (director: Major Lightner)
"Saying Sorry" (director: Major Lightner)
"This Is Who We Are"
"Pens and Needles" (director: Dale Resteghini)
"Rescue Me" (director: Adam Neustadter)
"Somewhere In Between"
"Nervous Breakdown" (director: Walter Robot)
"Gravestones"
"Is This What You Wanted?"
"Four White Walls"
"Golden Parachutes" (director: Terry Corso {Produced by Let Em Have It Productions})
"Just Another Ghost" (director: Benny Gagliardi)
"Hard to Breathe"
"Constant Dread"
"Tired and Alone"
"Spray Paint it Black"

References

Discographies of American artists
Post-hardcore group discographies